Novalukoml is a city in Chashniki district, Vitebsk Region, Belarus by Lukoml Lake. Lukoml power station is located in the city.

History
The history of Novolukoml goes back to 1964 when the construction of the Lukoml power station began. The settlement by the name of Pionersky was a temporary place of residence for the builders and the personnel of the station. 
In 1965 the settlement was renamed Novalukoml (lit.New Lukoml) after the adjacent village of Lukoml which was said to be the center of a principality centuries ago.
When the station was finished, the settlement grew steadily and was given the status of a city in 1970.
After the collapse of the USSR the growth of the city stopped as the station's role started to fade.
In 2006 the city was granted a coat of arms.
Nowadays, the infrastructure of Novalukoml is sufficient: there are an orthodox, catholic, and Protestant churches, a gym, a banya etc.
But the population is gradually decreasing due to the lack of employment and low salaries.

Demographics

References

Cities in Belarus
Populated places in Vitebsk Region
Chashniki District